The 1886 New Hampshire gubernatorial election was held on November 2, 1886. Republican nominee Charles H. Sawyer defeated Democratic nominee Thomas H. Cogswell with 48.86% of the vote.

General election

Candidates
Major party candidates
Charles H. Sawyer, Republican
Thomas H. Cogswell, Democratic

Other candidates
Joseph Wentworth, Prohibition

Results

References

1886
New Hampshire
Gubernatorial